Callifusus irregularis is a species of sea snail, a marine gastropod mollusk in the family Fasciolariidae, the spindle snails, the tulip snails and their allies.

Description

Distribution
This marine species occurs in the Gulf of California.

References

 Vermeij G.J. & Snyder M.A. (2018). Proposed genus-level classification of large species of Fusininae (Gastropoda, Fasciolariidae). Basteria. 82(4-6): 57–82.

External links
 Grabau A.W. (1904). Phylogeny of Fusus and its allies. Smithsonian Miscellaneous Collections. 44(1417): i-iii, 1-157, pls 1-18.

irregularis
Gastropods described in 1904